Giant Mountain is the twelfth-highest peak in the High Peaks Region of the Adirondack Park, in New York, USA. The peak is also known as "Giant of the Valley," due to its stature looking over Keene Valley and St. Huberts to the west. The prominent rock slides on the mountain's steep western face and its location away from most other large peaks make it quite an imposing figure, leading to its name.

Ascents
On 2 June 1797, Charles Broadhead and his survey party made the first recorded ascent of Giant Mountain, recorded as Giant-of-the-Valley.  They were surveying the boundaries of the Old Military Tract. Broadhead's was the first recorded ascent of any of the 46 Adirondack High Peaks.

Trails
There are three main trails up Giant, one from the east, and two from the west. The two most popular routes begin on trailheads along New York State Route 73, one near St. Huberts ("Roaring Brook Trail") and the other near Chapel Pond ("Zander Scott Trail"). The two trails climb the southern ridge of the mountain, meeting up about a mile south of the summit. The Zander Scott Trail is shorter than the Roaring Brook Trail but steeper.

The third trail begins from the east, near the town of New Russia, and is not as commonly climbed due to the longer hike. The route climbs Bald Peak, a smaller mountain with unusual krummholz that is predominantly Northern White Cedar (Thuja occidentalis), then begins the ascent of Rocky Peak Ridge. After summiting Rocky Peak Ridge, hikers descend a small coll before ascending to the Giant summit. This route is more commonly used by those attempting to become Adirondack Forty-Sixers, since Rocky Peak is a required peak.

References

External links
 
 
 Towns and Trails: Giant Mountain Day Hike
 Giant Mountain - LetsGoPlayOutside.com

Mountains of Essex County, New York
Adirondack High Peaks
Mountains of New York (state)